These are the international rankings of Zambia.

International rankings

References

Zambia